Proformative is a free online community for finance professionals  that is based in Silicon Valley, California, United States. It was incorporated in 2009 by John Kogan and Greg Stout to provide a global online community of senior-level corporate finance, accounting, and treasury, and related professionals such as CFOs, controllers, treasurers and the like.

Users of the community share knowledge on a wide variety of questions commonly faced by such professionals, including leadership, technical accounting and finance topics, career management, and purchasing of high-value products and services. Proformative has over 20,000 user-generated questions, answers, and resources, and is used by CFOs of public and privately held companies as well as practitioners at every level of such corporations.

Community users often reference other professional and industrial journals such as CFO magazine and Treasury & Risk.

Proformative reaches over 600,000 such professionals a month and is highly ranked on Alexa for its website traffic.

History 
Proformative was incorporated in 2009 by John Kogan and Greg Stout. The co-founders have backgrounds in corporate finance and scalable web architectures, respectively. Their goal was to provide a global online community for CFOs, comptrollers, treasurers and the like that was free, “noise free” (no ads), and peer-to-peer so that knowledge could easily be shared between operating professionals in a trusted environment.

On June 20, 2013, Proformative announced an addition to their community platform focused on Enterprise Social Procurement for the office of the CFO. The platform provides peer-based reviews of products and services commonly purchased by corporate finance, accounting, treasury and related professionals. Examples include ERP, budgeting & forecasting, audit services, liability insurance, and others in dozens of product and service categories.

References

External links 
Proformative

Online financial services companies of the United States
Directories